The Spæth House is a Rococo-style mansion in Helsingør, Denmark. It was built by the first sugar manugacfurer in Helsingør and served both as residence and warehouse. The building is listed and now houses a public music school for local youth.

History
The building takes its name after Johan Adam Spæth. Born in Zerbst, he had come to Helsingør at the age of 28 years. He initially worked as inn-keeper and wine trader. He soon began to trade with the many ships that called in Copenhagen to pay Sound Dues. In 1744, he was one of the seven founders of Helsingør merchant's guild and was its alderman from 1754 to 1762. Many of the ships carried sugar cane from the Danish West Indies. Sugar manufacturing was a lucrative business and in 1761, Spæth obtained a royal license to open Helsingør's sugar refinery at a site next to the coast road just south of Helsingør's Svingel Gate. A second sugar refinery was opened a little further down the coast road by C. C. Plum a little later.

In 1765, he began the construction of a three-storey mansion on the other side of the road which would both serve as his private residence and warehouse.  The sugar refinery was taken over by Niels Bregaard. Later it was converted into a merchant house owned by J. C. S. Bredstrup and subsequently by Lund & Rasmussen

The priest and poet Caspar Johannes Boye (1791-1853), who was pastor at Saint Olaf's Church, lived in the house with his large family in 1835-1847.

The building was expanded with a lower wing on the southwest gable in 1932. The building was in the 1980s and 1990s used by the Civil Defence Agency but was sold to Helsingør Municipality in 1999 and adapted for use by the city's public music school.

Architecture
The Rococo-style mansion consists of three storeys and a mansard roof with black-glazed tiles. It is nine bays wide and three bays deep. The front has a three-bay central projection tipped by a triangular pediment with arched niche. A one-bay projection on the northeast gable continues in a tall wall dormer with hoist, testifying to the building's dual function as both warehouse and residence.

Further reading
 Helsingørs første sukkerhus

References

Houses in Helsingør Municipality
Listed buildings and structures in Helsingør Municipality
Listed warehouses in Denmark
1761 establishments in Denmark